Phoebe Man (Man, Ching Ying) (born 1969 in Hong Kong) is a conceptual artist, media sculptor and independent curator based in Hong Kong. Her works have been shown in local and international art exhibitions, including Venice Biennale, Shanghai Biennale, Gwangju Biennale, and European Media Art Festival. Her works were included in Asian Art, The Art of Modern China and Hong Kong Eye: Hong Kong Contemporary Art.

Early life and education
Man studied at the Chinese University of Hong Kong from 1987 to 1991, where she majored in Fine Arts. She received her master's degree in Fine Arts (New Genres Major) from San Francisco Art Institute in 2000. She pursued and received her DFA in the Royal Melbourne Institute of Technology in 2012.

Career

Man is Associate Professor in the School of Creative Media at City University of Hong Kong. She is also the Advisor (Education) and Grant Examiner of Hong Kong Arts Development Council.

Her multi-media works explore the relationships between art history and the audience. Pursuing a cross-disciplinary practice, Man uses different mediums, including sculpture, installation, performance, video art and web art. Man develops a series of artworks concerning the sexual violence issue with profound background research. Although much of her work can be read through a feminist perspective, she contends that her work “is never an illustration of feminist theory”. She wishes to have "more room for imagination" and "take the position of a human being rather than a feminist" when she works.

She also works as a curator and often organizes shows to promote Hong Kong art. She served as the director of Asian Experimental Video Festival in Hong Kong, the guest curator of a number of local and international experimental video festivals, and is one of the co-founders of Para/Site Art Space.

Awards and accomplishments
Man's video work "Rati" won the Hong Kong Independent Short Film & Video Award and was invited to show in more than 30 festivals and art events in Brazil, France, Norway, Netherlands and Germany from 2000 to 2019. She received a fellowship from the Asian Cultural Council and the Urban Council Fine Arts Award from the Hong Kong Museum of Art in 1998. She was also selected as one of the ten "Smart Women of the 21st Century" by Marie Claire in the same year. She has received a number of grants from the University Grants Committee and Hong Kong Arts Development Council.

Artworks

 "Phoebe Man's Augmented Reality public art: "How are you?" and "A" (2018) 
 "Birthday Cakes" (2015) 
 "Love China Love Hong Kong Thick Toast" (2015) 
"One Pyeong of Golden Bricks" (2015) 
 "Erosion of Home" (2014-15) 
 "If I Were" (2014-5) 
 "One Person One Heart" (2014) 
 "Touch the Moon" (2014)  
 "Home Sweet Home" (2012) 
"Rewriting History" (2010) 
Washing the Light (2003) 
 "Rati" (2000-01) 
"Orange" (1997) 
 "Beautiful Flowers" (1996) 
"A Present For Her Growth" (1996) 
"Rice Bed" (1994)

References

Hong Kong women artists
1964 births
Living people
San Francisco Art Institute alumni
Chinese University of Hong Kong people
RMIT University alumni
Hong Kong artists
Chinese women curators